Lagoa dos Gatos is a municipality in the state of Pernambuco, Brazil.

History
Portuguese explorers first reached the place in the late 18th century, and it is presumed that José Cavalcanti Fragoso was the one to establish the settlement of Peri-Peri, which would later become the town. Lagoa dos Gatos was officially recognised as a populational gathering in 1832 and became a village in 1839. In 1928 it was renamed Frei Caneca, until 1938, when it reverted to its original name.

Local legends state that the name, which literally means "Cat's Lagoon", was used by its first explorers after sighting a few margays at a small lagoon.

In 1832 the mountainous surroundings of Lagoa dos Gatos played an important role at the "Guerra dos Cabanos" (War of Cabanos), one of the many uprisings in Brasil's first years of independence.

Geography
 State - Pernambuco
 Region - Agreste Pernambucano
 Boundaries - Cupira  (N); São Benedito do Sul   (S); Panelas   (W); Belém de Maria and Jaqueira   (E)
 Area - 233.16 km2
 Elevation - 464 m
 Hydrography - Una river
 Vegetation - Subcaducifólia forest
 Climate - tropical hot and humid
 Annual average temperature - 24.0 c
 Distance to Recife - 159 km

Economy
The main economic activities in Lagoa dos Gatos are based in agribusiness, especially manioc, sugarcane and creation of cattle and goats.

Economic Indicators

Economy by Sector
2006

Health Indicators

References

 Callado, João Pereira - História de Lagoa dos Gatos (1981)
 Enciclopédia dos Municípios Pernambucanos
 Globo Rural nº180 – P. 80-83 – Out/2000 "Gatos Ameaçados"

Municipalities in Pernambuco
Populated places established in 1832